1983 Emmy Awards may refer to:

 35th Primetime Emmy Awards, the 1983 Emmy Awards ceremony honoring primetime programming
 10th Daytime Emmy Awards, the 1983 Emmy Awards ceremony honoring daytime programming
 11th International Emmy Awards, the 1983 Emmy Awards ceremony honoring international programming

Emmy Award ceremonies by year